Acyphas semiochrea, the omnivorous tussock moth, is a moth of the subfamily Lymantriinae first described by Gottlieb August Wilhelm Herrich-Schäffer in 1855. It is found along most of the coast of Australia, including: New South Wales, Queensland, South Australia, Tasmania, Victoria and Western Australia.

The wingspan is about 30 mm. Adult females are white and have an orange tuft on the tail. Males are also white but sometimes have a dark mark at the tornus of each forewing or a broad dark band along the margin of each forewing. The hairs around the thorax are sometimes yellowish. Sometimes the black skin of the thorax and/or abdomen shows through between the white hairs.

It is considered a pest on Pinus radiata, but has also been recorded feeding on Acacia, Eucalyptus, Pultenaea, Dodonaea, Choretrum, Myoporum and Tamarix. The caterpillars are brown and hairy, with a pencil of black hairs each side of its head and a hairy tail.

References

"Species Acyphas semiochrea (Herrich-Schäffer, 1855)". Australian Faunal Directory. Archived 5 April 2011.

Moths of Australia
Lymantriinae
Moths described in 1855